Cabinet of Leon Kozłowski - cabinet headed by Prime Minister Leon Kozłowski, appointed by President Ignacy Mościcki on May 15, 1934 and serving until its resignation on March 28, 1935.
 Leon Kozłowski (BBWR) - Prime Minister
 Józef Piłsudski - Minister of Military Affairs
 Bronisław Piernacki (BBWR) - Minister of Internal Affairs
 Józef Beck (BBWR) - Minister of Foreign Affairs
 Władysław Marian Zawadzki (BBWR) - Minister of the Treasury
 Czesław Michałowski - Minister of Justice
 Wacław Jędrzejewicz (BBWR) - Minister of Religions and Public Enlightenment
 Bronisław Nakoniecznikow-Klukowski - Minister of Agriculture and Rural Reforms
 Michał Butkiewicz - Minister of Connection
 Emil Kaliński - Minister of Post
 Henryk Floyar-Rajchman - Minister of Industry and Commerce
 Jerzy Paciorkowski - Minister of Labor and Public Services

Changes:
 June 16, 1934 - Prime Minister Kozłowski became Acting Minister of Internal Affairs in place on assassinated (on June 15) Piernacki
 June 28, 1934 - Juliusz Poniatowski replaced Nakoniecznikow-Klukowski as Minister of AgricultureMarian Zyndram-Kościałkowski became Minister of Internal Affairs

Kozlowski, Leon
1934 establishments in Poland
1935 disestablishments in Poland
Cabinets established in 1934
Cabinets disestablished in 1935